Sunset Point is a promontory in Yarmouth, Maine, United States. Sunset Road leads to the point itself. It begins at an intersection with Princes Point Road, Battery Point Lane and Nubbin Reach.

In the early 1880s, the adjacent (to the east) Princes Point began to develop as a summer colony. For several years it had become a favorite camping spot for the villagers and the inhabitants of the inland parts of the town who came here for clam bakes and picnics. The town road ended at the John Allen Drinkwater barn, and here a large gate opened into the pasture which included the two points.

Around 1884, the first to person to own a lot on at Sunset Point was Samuel O. Carruthers.

References 

Landforms of Yarmouth, Maine